Kim Jae-ryong (born 1959) is a North Korean politician who served as Premier of North Korea from April 2019 to August 2020. A senior official within the Workers' Party of Korea, he has served as the director of the Organization and Guidance Department since 2020 and as a deputy to the Supreme People's Assembly.

Career
Relatively little is known about Kim's early career. Before his premiership, he held positions in political guidance at various industrial sites. Around 2007, he was appointed to his first important position as the secretary of the Workers' Party of Korea (WPK) North Pyongan provincial committee. He was appointed acting secretary of the WPK Chagang provincial committee in 2015 and from 2016 to 2019 he was officially the provincial party secretary, when he was replaced by Kang Bong-hun in that position. Kim became a member of the WPK Central Committee in 2016.

He is also believed at one point to have held a post within the Workers' Party of Korea that oversaw Sinuiju and the free economic zone area of the city.

Premiership
On 10 March 2019, Kim was elected to the Supreme People's Assembly in the parliamentary election. Less than a month later, during the first session of the 14th Supreme People's Assembly, Kim was appointed premier, replacing Pak Pong-ju. He was also elected to be a member of the Politburo and the Central Military Commission.

Kim as premier has also conducted multiple site inspections around the country from agricultural sites, factories and even to an apartment project in the capitol of Pyongyang.

Kim was relieved of his position as premier on 13 August 2020 and replaced by Kim Tok-hun.

Post-premiership
Following his dismissal as premier, Kim was appointed to lead the Organization and Guidance Department, and he was in charge of preparations for the 8th Party Congress, after which he maintained his seat in the Politburo. Previous claims that he had been appointed to a new body called the Organization Administrative Department appeared inconsistent with later reports indicating that another official was in charge of the newly-created department handling judicial affairs.

References

|-

|-

Living people
1959 births
Date of birth missing (living people)
Prime Ministers of North Korea
Members of the Supreme People's Assembly
People from Chagang
Members of the 8th Politburo of the Workers' Party of Korea
Members of the 8th Central Committee of the Workers' Party of Korea
Vice Chairmen of the Workers' Party of Korea and its predecessors